The Oceana Neighborhood Historic District encompasses an early 20th-century planned neighborhood subdivision in Virginia Beach, Virginia. This area was platted out in 1906 with a rectilinear street grid, and saw development of its commercial corridors in the 1930s. It contains a diversity of period residential architecture, including many examples of Colonial Revival architecture, as well as a number of older houses that predate the subdivision.

The district was listed on the National Register of Historic Places in 2017.

See also
National Register of Historic Places listings in Virginia Beach, Virginia

References

Historic districts on the National Register of Historic Places in Virginia
National Register of Historic Places in Virginia Beach, Virginia
Historic districts in Virginia